is a prefectural museum in the city of Utsunomiya, Japan. The collection relates to the history and natural history of Tochigi Prefecture. The museum opened in 1982.

See also
 Shimotsuke Province
 List of Historic Sites of Japan (Tochigi)

References

External links
  Tochigi Prefectural Museum
  Tochigi Prefectural Museum

Museums in Tochigi Prefecture
Utsunomiya
History museums in Japan
Prefectural museums
Museums established in 1982
1982 establishments in Japan